The 2007 Grand Prix motorcycle racing season was the 59th F.I.M Road Racing World Championship season. The season consisted out of 18 races for the MotoGP class and 17 for the 125cc and 250cc classes, beginning with the Qatar motorcycle Grand Prix on 10 March 2007 and ending with the Valencian Community motorcycle Grand Prix on 4 November.

Season summary
The 2007 season was significant as it introduced a new regulation which specifies that competitors in the MotoGP class were allowed use up to 800 cc motorcycles; between 2002 and 2006, competitors had been allowed to use 990 cc motorcycles. While the 800cc motorcycles had less power than their 990cc counterparts, their ability to brake later and carry more speed through turns due to their lighter weight (which actually increased their power to weight ratio) allowed them to break lap records in pre-season testing.

Casey Stoner won the MotoGP title, winning 10 of the 18 races to finish with a lead of 125 points over second placed Dani Pedrosa. Jorge Lorenzo won his second 250cc title, and Gábor Talmácsi won the 125cc title.

Stoner had a breakthrough season on the Ducati, the team winning its first world title on the Grand Prix scene. It was also the first time since 1974 that the premiere category had not been won by a Japanese constructor. The new 800cc Ducati engine had a significant advantage over the other manufacturers in straight line speed but was tricky to ride through corners for Stoner's experienced teammate Loris Capirossi. Stoner was in strong contention early on but Valentino Rossi was very close for a long period of the season, before Stoner started to pull away at mid-season and sealed his title with several races to go, with Rossi's title challenge fading.

Up to the end of 2006, speculation suggested that Honda would have the advantage of the new 800cc engines, as they could modify their existing engines easier than other manufacturers.  In practice, Honda suffered the most from the regulation change, with only Dani Pedrosa and Marco Melandri making any impression on the leaders. Stoner scored a string of wins for Ducati, Suzuki saw Chris Vermeulen take their first win since the advent of four-stroke regulations and John Hopkins posted his first podium finish. The Kawasaki team also made progress with improved results.

In addition to the capacity reduction, MotoGP teams were also restricted to 31 tires per race weekend per rider. This change seemed to have favored the Bridgestone's wider performance range over the more temperature- and track-specific Michelins. Pressure from top riders and declining viewership led Dorna CEO Carmelo Ezpeleta to propose a single-tire manufacturer for MotoGP. In the end, rules were amended to allow 9 more tires per weekend per rider, and Valentino Rossi switched to Bridgestone for the 2008 season while his Fiat Yamaha teammate Jorge Lorenzo used Michelins.

2007 was also final season of Dunlop competed in MotoGP class to date.

2007 Grand Prix season calendar
The following Grands Prix were scheduled to take place in 2007:

 † = MotoGP class only
 †† = Saturday race

Calendar changes
 The Spanish and Qatar Grand Prix swapped places, with Qatar hosting the opening round instead of Spain.
 The Dutch TT and British Grand Prix swapped places, with Britain hosting the eighth round while the Netherlands hosted the ninth round.
 Only the MotoGP class raced during the United States Grand Prix because of a Californian law on air pollution, preventing the 125 and 250cc classes from racing.
 The San Marino Grand Prix was added on the calendar after an 18-year absence. The venue hosting the round was the Misano World Circuit instead of the previously used Mugello Circuit.
 The Malaysian and Australian Grand Prix were moved back, from 10 and 17 September to 21 and 14 October respectively.
 The Malaysian and Australian Grand Prix swapped places, with Australia hosting the sixteenth round while Malaysia hosting the seventeenth round.
 The Japanese and Portuguese Grand Prix were moved forward, from 24 September and 15 October to 23 and 16 September respectively.
 The Japanese and Portuguese Grand Prix swapped places, with Portugal hosting the fourteenth round while Japan hosted the fifteenth round.

Regulation changes
The following changes are made to the regulation for the 2007 season:

Sporting regulations

 A rider cannot stop in the pits when observing a ride-through penalty.

 Any use of two-way radio voice communication is now prohibited.

Technical regulations

 Originally in 2004, it was decided to reduce the engine capacity of all bikes from 990cc to 900cc from the 2007 season onwards in the MotoGP class. However, it was decided to instead limit it to 800cc instead in 2005.

 The minimum weights for the bikes has been changed for the MotoGP class. The weights are now as follows:
For bikes with two cylinders or less, the minimum weight will be 133 kg.
For bikes with three cylinders, the minimum weight will be 140,5 kg.
For bikes with four cylinders, the minimum weight will be 148 kg.
For bikes with five cylinders, the minimum weight will be 155, 5 kg.
For bikes with six cylinders or more, the minimum weight will be 163 kg.

 The use of oval pistons will now be banned in the MotoGP class.
 From this year onwards, the use of two-stroke engines will now be banned in the MotoGP class.
 The fuel tank capacity for all bikes will be lowered from 22 to 21 litres in the MotoGP class.
 Changes have been made for the use of fuel, oil and other coolants. Unleaded petrol will comply with the FIM specifications if they have the following features:

 - Property Units Min. Max. Test Method RON 95.0 102.0 ISO 5164
 - MON 85.0 90.0 ISO 5163
 - Oxygen % m/m 2.7 ASTM D 4815
 - Nitrogen % m/m 0.2 ASTM D 4629
 - Benzene % v/v 1.0 EN 238
 - RVP kPa 90 EN 13016-1
 - Lead g/L 0.005 EN 237
 - Density at 15 °C kg/m3 720.0 775,0 780.0 ASTM D 4052
 - Oxidation Stability minutes 360 ASTM D 525
 - Existent gum mg/100 mL 5.0 EN ISO 6246
 - Sulphur mg/kg 50,0 ASTM D 5453
 - Copper Corrosion rating C1 ISO 2160
 - Distillation:
 - E at 70 °C % v/v 22,0 15.0 50.0 ISO 3405
 - E at 100 °C % v/v 46.0 71.0 ISO 3405
 - E at 150 °C % v/v 75.0 ISO 3405
 - Final Boiling Point °C 210,0 215.0ISO 3405
 - Residue % v/v 2.0 ISO 3405
 - Olefins(*) % v/v 18.0 ASTM D 1319:1998
 - Gas Chromatography
 - Aromatics(*) % v/v 35,0 42.0 ASTM D 1319:1998
 - Gas Chromatography
 - Total di-olefins % m/m 1.0 GCMS / HPLC

 New tyre restrictions will be introduced for the MotoGP class. A wet tyre is specified as 'a tyre which has a land to sea ratio of at least 20% overall, and a minimum ratio of 7% in each third of the section profile'. The tyre can be shaped or hand cut, but each groove must have a minimum depth of at least three millimeters over 90% of its total length. Any tyre with a land to sea ratio which is lower than 20% will be marked as a slick tyre. If there is a dispute, the decision of the Technical Director will be considered final.

 Before the start of the season (defined as 'the day before the start of the first IRTA MotoGP test of the current year'), all teams must register the tyre brand they will be using with the Grand Prix Technical Director. If a team opts to change its designated tyre brand during the season, said team must inform the Technical Director via writing prior to the start before the start of examining at the event where the change will happen.

 Teams that are supplied by a tyre manufacturer that has accomplished at least two MotoGP race wins in dry conditions since the first race of the 2005 season will be restricted in the number of slick tyres that each of the teams' riders can use at a single event. The amount will be as follows: During all practice sessions, the warm-up and the race, a maximum of 31 slick tyres will be permitted. Of this, the amount of allowed front tyres are fourteen and the amount of allowed rear tyres are seventeen.

 When a tyre manufacturer who is not subject to the limitations at the beginning of the season manages to score two MotoGP wins in dry conditions during the current season, it will become subject to the restrictions at the third event after the one where the second win was accomplished.

 Between 12:00 and 17:00 on the day before the start of the first official practice session, the Technical Director will mark the available tyres for each entered rider.

 Every motorcycle entering the track fitted with either slick or hand cut tyres must have its tyres checked for compliance.

 In the event of an interrupted race, a rider must use tyres from his designation of marked tyres for the restarted race.

 In the unlikely event of a tyre being damaged accidentally during the process of fitting it on, it may be replaced with a new tyre of the same specification with the consent of the Technical Director. These replacement tyres will be marked and included in the assignment of the specific rider.

 If an uncommon or unpredictable safety concern emerges for a manufacturer during an even, causing a team supplied with its tyres to not safely compete in the race, then that manufacturer must inform and prove the seriousness of the problem to the Technical Director. The Technical Director may then ask the Race Direction to permit an exception. A request must be made before 17:00 on the day of qualifying practice. If an exception is allowed, each rider using tyres supplied by the manufacturer which is permitted the exception will be supplied with three tyres of a new specification (front and/or rear depending on the discovery of the problem). Such replacement tyres will be marked by the Technical Director and only these tyres can be used in the race. A new provisional starting grid will be published with all of the riders supplied with the tyres of the manufacturers granted the exception starting at the bottom of the grid in the order of their qualifying positions.

2007 Grand Prix season results

 † = MotoGP class only
 †† = Saturday Race

Participants

MotoGP participants

† Ilmor GP withdrew before Spanish race.

Mid-season changes
On 15 March 2007, Mario Illien of Ilmor announced that the team would be taking a break from the MotoGP series as a result of funding issues.
During practice for the Chinese GP, Olivier Jacque injured his arm in a crash and withdrew from the event. He missed his home race, at Le Mans, and was replaced by Fonsi Nieto.
Team Roberts announced they expanded to a second bike from the Mugello race onwards, which was ridden by Kurtis Roberts.
Kenny Roberts Jr. withdrew from the series in June. In those rounds the sole KR212V was ridden by his brother Kurtis.
On 21 June, it was announced that Anthony West would be replacing Olivier Jacque at Kawasaki for the remainder of the season.
During practice for the Dutch TT, Toni Elías broke his left femur. He was replaced by Michel Fabrizio at the German Grand Prix and Miguel Duhamel at the United States Grand Prix.
During the first practice session at the US GP, Alex Hofmann broke a bone and sustained a soft tissue injury in his left hand in a collision with Sylvain Guintoli and he was unable to compete during the remainder of the weekend. Chaz Davies was invited to take his ride for the remainder of the weekend despite having no experience on any MotoGP bike or Bridgestone tyres. Hofmann was also sidelined from Czech GP, where Iván Silva replaced him.
Shinichi Itoh rode as a replacement rider on a Pramac d'Antin Ducati after Alex Hofmann was released from the team following the Portuguese Grand Prix.

250cc participants

Mid-season changes
Roberto Locatelli was seriously injured in a practise session crash at the Spanish GP weekend. Gilera didn't replace him and Locatelli returned to the series in the French GP.
As a result of a crash in qualifying in China, Yuki Takahashi broke his left arm and missed the French GP, which he won in 2006.  He was not replaced for the event.
Starting from the French GP, Humangest Racing was officially called Kopron Team Scot.
Following Anthony West's step up to the Moto GP class with Kawasaki, Dan Linfoot was signed to replace him from the Donington Park round.  Also, Arturo Tizón was sacked by his team and replaced by Efrén Vázquez.
Federico Sandi replaced Dan Linfoot from Australian GP onwards.
Taro Sekiguchi missed couple of rounds after being injured in Czech Republic Grand Prix. Having had many injuries during the last couple of seasons, he decided to change his race number in his return, in the Australian Grand Prix.

125cc participants

Mid-season changes
Fontana Racing was called Skilled Racing Team before the season started following the withdrawal of their sponsor ISPA for Team Sicilia.
Stefano Musco missed the Qatar & Spanish GPs through injury and was replaced by Dino Lombardi. Later Lombardi replaced Musco on regular basis.
Mike Di Meglio sustained a broken collarbone in a crash in qualifying for the Spanish GP and was told by doctors to allow more time to recover.  He was replaced at the Turkish GP by Kev Coghlan, who had been originally on the 250cc entry list prior to the withdrawal of his team, Winona Racing.
Starting from the French GP, Scot Racing Team was officially called Kopron Team Scot.
At the British GP, Enrique Jerez replaced Dino Lombardi.
From Portuguese GP onwards, Stefan Bradl replaced Hugo van den Berg on regular basis.
Following Federico Sandi's move to 250cc class, Ferruccio Lamborghini replaced him in Skilled Racing Team, starting from Australian Grand Prix.
Glenn Scott replaced Stefano Bianco in Australian Grand Prix.

Standings

MotoGP riders' standings
Scoring system
Points were awarded to the top fifteen finishers. Rider had to finish the race to earn points.

 Rounds marked with a light blue background were under wet race conditions or stopped by rain.
 Riders marked with light blue background were eligible for Rookie of the Year awards.

250cc riders' standings
Scoring system
Points were awarded to the top fifteen finishers. Rider had to finish the race to earn points.

 Rounds marked with a light blue background were under wet race conditions or stopped by rain.
 Riders marked with light blue background were eligible for Rookie of the Year awards.

125cc riders' standings
Scoring system
Points were awarded to the top fifteen finishers. Rider had to finish the race to earn points.

 Rounds marked with a light blue background were under wet race conditions or stopped by rain.
 Riders marked with light blue background were eligible for Rookie of the Year awards.

Constructors' standings
Scoring system
Points were awarded to the top fifteen finishers. A rider had to finish the race to earn points.
 

 Each constructor gets the same number of points as their best placed rider in each race.
 Rounds marked with a light blue background were under wet race conditions or stopped by rain.

MotoGP

250cc

125cc

Teams' standings
 Each team gets the total points scored by their two riders, including replacement riders. In one rider team, only the points scored by that rider will be counted. Wildcard riders do not score points.
 Rounds marked with a light blue background were under wet race conditions or stopped by rain.

MotoGP

References

 
Grand Prix motorcycle racing seasons
2007 in motorcycle sport